Diaporthopsis is a genus of fungi belonging to the family Diaporthaceae.

The species of this genus are found in Europe and Northern America.

Species:

Diaporthopsis acus 
Diaporthopsis apiculosa 
Diaporthopsis nigrella 
Diaporthopsis pantherina 
Diaporthopsis sclerophila 
Diaporthopsis spiraeae 
Diaporthopsis urticae

References

Diaporthaceae
Sordariomycetes genera